Giambettino Cignaroli (Verona, July 4, 1706 – Verona, December 1, 1770) was an Italian painter of the Rococo and early Neoclassic period.

Biography
He was a pupil of Santo Prunato and Antonio Balestra and active mostly in the area of the Veneto. He became the director of the academy of painting and sculpture of Verona in December 1764. The Academy was subsequently known as Accademia Cignaroli. Among his many pupils were Maria Suppioti Ceroni, Giovanni Battista Lorenzi, Saverio Dalla Rosa, Domenico Mondini, Domenico Pedarzoli, and Christopher Unterberger. His brother Giovanni Domenico Cignaroli was also a painter.

For the Austrian governor of Lombardy and a collector of antiquities, Count Karl von Firmian, Cignaroli painted two canvases on Greco-Roman episodes, a thematic preferred by Neoclassic painters: Death of Cato (1759) and Death of Socrates.

Giambettino was born into a family of artists, and this tradition continued after his death with his children. Artists from his family who were contemporaries and elders of Giambettino include  
his uncle Leonardo Seniore, and his two sons (cousins of Giambettino), Martino and Pietro.

Works

Martyr of Saints Felix and Fortunatus (1737), Bergamo Cathedral
Apollo and Marsyas (1739) and the Sacrifice of Iphigenia (1741), Villa Pompei, Illasi, Verona
Saint Helena (1741), Castelvecchio, Verona
Saint Procolus Visiting Saints Fermus and Rusticus (1744), Bergamo Cathedral
Virgin and Child With Saints Jerome and Alexander (1744), Chiesa dell'Ospedale, Bergamo
Aurora (1748), Casa Fattori, Verona
Death of Rachel, Accademia, Venice
Death of Socrates (1759)
Death of Cato (1759)
Sacrifice of Isaac
The Travels of Moses
Wolfgang Amadeus Mozart at the age of 14 in Verona (1770)

References

Sources
Giambettino Cignaroli's Deaths of Cato and of Socrates, Joseph Geiger. Zeitschrift für Kunstgeschichte (1996) pp270–278.
Studi sopra la storia della pittura italiana dei secoli xiv e xv e della scuola pittorica. By Cesare Bernasconi. Published 1864 (google books). Original from Oxford University

1718 births
1770 deaths
Painters from Verona
18th-century Italian painters
Italian male painters
Rococo painters
18th-century Italian male artists